Seyidlər (also, Seidlyar) is a village in the Zardab Rayon of Azerbaijan.

References 

Populated places in Zardab District